Xyloblaptus is a genus of horned powder-post beetles in the family Bostrichidae. There are at least three described species in Xyloblaptus.

Species
These three species belong to the genus Xyloblaptus:
 Xyloblaptus mexicanus Lesne, 1939
 Xyloblaptus prosopidis Fisher, 1950
 Xyloblaptus quadrispinosus (LeConte, 1866)

References

Further reading

External links

 

Bostrichidae
Articles created by Qbugbot